SS Cornwallis was a  steam merchant ship built in 1921 for the Canadian Government as Canadian Transporter. In 1932 she was transferred to Canadian National Steamships Ltd and renamed SS Cornwallis. She was sunk on 3 December 1944 after being torpedoed by the German submarine  on its way to St John with a loss of 43 crew.

Construction and design 
Cornwallis was built by J.Coughlan & Sons in Vancouver. British Columbia, Canada for the Canadian Government as a steam merchant vessel. She was built in yard 20 and was completed in October 1921.

She had a gross register tonnage of 5,458. As for propulsion, she was powered by a single 3-cylinder triple-expansion engine that drove one screw.

History 
From 1921 to 1932 Canadian Transporter was owned by the Canadian Government. In 1932 she was transferred to the Canadian National Steamships Ltd and was renamed Cornwallis.

1938 Supreme Court of Canada Case 
On 6 November 1935, a crew member was severely injured after a wave struck the deck of Cornwallis. The operator Canadian National Steamships Ltd was taken to court and was sued for CAD4,000 in damages.

1942 first U-boat attack 

Although the majority of the torpedoes were caught by the harbour's torpedo net, a single torpedo managed to breach the net and hit Cornwallis just abreast of the #2 hold. The ship sunk only partially, due to its location in shallow waters. She was raised, patched temporarily, and towed to the Swan Hunter shipyard at Chaguaramas, Trinidad -and then towed again to Mobile on 24 January 1943. Repairs were finished in August 1943 and the ship would subsequently return to service.

1944 second U-boat attack and sinking 
On 20 November 1944, Cornwallis left Barbados with a cargo of sugar and molasses. She left port with a crew complement of 48 including seven armed guards and a British DBS. The ship's captain, Emerson Robinson, was instructed to sail unescorted through the Cape Cod Canal and then up the coast of New England before finally arriving at their destination Saint John.

At 06:00 a single torpedo struck the forward section of the ship. An SOS radio call was sent out by the crew and was received at Yarmouth, Nova Scotia.

The crew attempted to lower the amidships lifeboat on the starboard side but the lifeboat was caught on the davits rendering it unusable. The ship sank on her starboard side in under ten minutes. Of the 48 crew members, only 6 would escape the sinking vessel and make their way to a lifeboat which had floated free when the vessel sunk. The survivors would later be picked up by the fishing vessel Notre Dame with one perishing en route due to hypothermia. The five survivors would be dropped off at Rockland, Maine.

Official numbers and code letters 
Official numbers were a forerunner to IMO Numbers. Cornwallis had an official number of 150448 and the Code Letters TPWB. In 1932 her code letters were changed to VGBY.

Wreckage 

See also 
 The Canadian Merchant Navy in World War II

References 

1921 ships
Ships sunk by German submarines in World War II
Ships of Canada
Shipwrecks of the Maine coast